Banco Pan, is a Brazilian midsize commercial bank headquartered in São Paulo.  The bank main focus is granting consumer loans to individuals of lower to medium income brackets, such as consumer loans, payroll deduction loans, credit cards branded as Visa or MasterCard, insurance products, leasing, and group financial activities.

History
Banco Pan was founded in 1969 when Grupo Silvio Santos, owned by billionaire media-man Silvio Santos purchased the Banco Real Sul and renamed to PanAmericano.

The bank has operated as a multi-service bank since 1991, having started its credit card operations in 1994 and leasing operations in 1998 through a subsidiary, Panamericano Arrendamento Mercantil. In 1999, the insurance company, Panamericano de Seguros was incorporated into the bank. Banco Pan has been operating with payroll deduction loans since 2002.

In 2005 it came to public attention for large bonuses. In 2009 the second largest Brazilian state-owned bank Caixa Econômica Federal, bought part of the bank's shares of Grupo Silvio Santos to become the second largest shareholder of the institution.

Crisis of 2010 

On November 8, 2010, Silvio Santos, announces loan of 2.5 billion reais (1.4 billion dollars) to cover an accounting fraud at cash Banco Pan. Loan by the Credit Guarantee Fund and secured by assets of the business assets of Grupo Silvio Santos, it was necessary to restore full balance sheet because the bank continued to accounting for credit portfolios have been sold to other financial institutions, thus falsifying assets.

Sale to BTG Pactual 

On January 29, 2010, the Brazilian newspaper Folha de S.Paulo, announced that the shortfall of the bank was of 4.0 billion reals (2.3 billion dollars). In response Silvio Santos sold the shares that Grupo Silvio Santos had in the bank to BTG Pactual. The businessman did not receive any value in return, as the BTG Pactual and Caixa Economica Federal assumed all the accumulated debt.

Operations 

Currently the bank headquartered in São Paulo is one of the largest midsize banks in Brazil, and has many competitors, as Daycoval, BicBanco and others.

External links
 Official Website

References 

Banks of Brazil
Companies listed on B3 (stock exchange)